Omnis may refer to:
Omnis Studio, a development program
OMNIS, a Malagasy governmental organization
Omnis, Inc., an American company
"Omnis", a song by Phinehas from the album Till the End

See also
Omni (disambiguation)
Omnia (disambiguation)